Hook Mountain State Park is a  undeveloped state park located in Rockland County, New York. The park includes a portion of the Hudson River Palisades on the western shore of the Hudson River, and is part of the Palisades Interstate Park system. Hook Mountain State Park is functionally part of a continuous complex of parks that also includes Rockland Lake State Park, Nyack Beach State Park, and Haverstraw Beach State Park.

A central feature of the park is Hook Mountain, a  summit overlooking Rockland Lake and the Hudson River.

History

Hook Mountain was known to Dutch settlers of the region as Verdrietige Hook, meaning "Tedious Point", which may have been a reference to how long the mountain remained in view while sailing past it along the Hudson River, or for the troublesome winds that sailors encountered near the point. Hook Mountain has also been known in the past as Diedrick Hook.

Like other areas of the Hudson River Palisades, the landscape now included in Hook Mountain State Park was threatened by quarrying in the late 19th and early 20th centuries. To ensure the land's protection, the property was acquired to be a part of the Palisades Interstate Park in 1911.

Portions of Hook Mountain State Park and nearby Nyack Beach State Park were designated as a National Natural Landmark in 1980 for their portion of the Palisades Sill.

Hook Mountain was designated by the New York Audubon Society as an Important Bird Area in 1997, due to its importance as a feeding area for migratory songbirds and hawks. It has been utilized annually as a hawk monitoring station since 1971. The park is currently designated as a "Bird Conservation Area" by the New York State Office of Parks, Recreation and Historic Preservation.

In May 2015, the Sisters of Our Lady of Christian Doctrine announced that they were considering allowing their  property to become a part of Hook Mountain State Park. The order's property, which is adjacent to the southern portion of the park, could be sold to The Trust for Public Land, who would then transfer the property to New York State.

Park description
Hook Mountain State Park is undeveloped, and primarily offers space for passive recreation such as hiking and bird-watching. The Long Path makes its way through the park and passes over Hook Mountain's summit.

Although the park is undeveloped, it is functionally part of a larger complex of parks that share continuous borders, including Rockland Lake State Park, Nyack Beach State Park, and Haverstraw Beach State Park, which contain dedicated recreational facilities.

See also
List of New York state parks
List of National Natural Landmarks in New York

References

External links

Palisades Interstate Park Conservancy: Hook Mountain State Park

National Natural Landmarks in New York (state)
Palisades Interstate Park system
Parks in Rockland County, New York
State parks of New York (state)